Daniel Jeundikwa Kaova Tjongarero (1947  - 23 April 1997) was a Namibian politician and independence activist. He graduated in 1973 at the University of the North now the University of Limpopo. He was a member of the Constituent Assembly of Namibia tasked with crafting the Constitution of the new Republic. He became a member of the National Assembly (Namibia) at independence until 1995.

He was married to Agnes Tjongarero.

References

1947 births
1997 deaths
Members of the National Assembly (Namibia)
SWAPO politicians
Government ministers of Namibia
Herero people
Augustineum Secondary School alumni
20th-century Namibian politicians
Namibian educators
Namibian prisoners and detainees
People's Liberation Army of Namibia personnel
Namibian independence activists
National heroes of Namibia
Namibian people imprisoned abroad